The Free & Equal Elections Foundation (Free & Equal) is a 501(c)(3) non-profit, non-partisan organization in the United States, the mission of which is to empower American voters through education and advocacy of electoral reforms. Free & Equal leads national, state, and local efforts to open the electoral process in the United States by hosting all-inclusive gubernatorial, Presidential, and senatorial debates; organizing Electoral Reform Symposiums; producing United We Stand tours; and supporting individuals running for office. Free & Equal was first organized in 1982 as the Foundation for Free Campaigns and Elections, before being formally reorganized in 2008 by Christina Tobin, an American activist and leader in the election reform and voters' rights movement.

Presidential debates

2008

During the 2008 presidential election, Free & Equal hosted a presidential debate at the Mayflower Renaissance Hotel in Washington, D.C., on October 23, 2008. Constitution Party candidate Chuck Baldwin and independent candidate Ralph Nader participated in a debate moderated by journalist Chris Hedges. The Free & Equal debate was the only presidential debate featuring independent and third-party candidates held during the 2008 election to be broadcast to a national audience. The debate was broadcast live on C-SPAN2 in prime time.

2012

In 2012, Free & Equal sponsored the October 23, 2012 debate among four third party candidates for President of the United States. It featured Gary Johnson (Libertarian Party), Jill Stein (Green Party), Virgil Goode (Constitution Party), and Rocky Anderson (Justice Party). The debate was moderated by former Larry King Live host Larry King and Christina Tobin. It was televised by RT TV, Al Jazeera English, and C-SPAN.

2016

Free & Equal hosted an open debate along with Student Voices Count at the University of Colorado Boulder's Macky Auditorium on October 25, 2016. Originally, all presidential candidates with ballot access sufficient to represent a majority of electoral votes were invited. in October 2016, Free and Equal extended the invitation to all candidates with ballot lines representing at least fifteen percent of potential voters: the Democratic, Republican, Libertarian, Green, Constitution, Reform, and Socialism and Liberation parties, as well as independent candidate Evan McMullin. Gary Johnson, who participated in the 2012 debate, had already publicly declined in July 2016 to debate Jill Stein on The Young Turks because of a matter of "just time".

2020

Primaries
Early on March 4, 2020, the Free & Equal Elections Foundation held a debate at the Hilton Chicago Hotel. Various third-party candidates, as well as minor candidates affiliated with the Democratic and Republican parties attended. Some, but not all, of the participants would go on to be their parties nominees.

General election
Two debates were held prior to the general election. The first was on October 8, 2020, in Denver, Colorado, with participation limited to candidates on the ballot in at least eight states. A second debate with the same candidates occurred on October 24, 2020, in Cheyenne, Wyoming.

Electoral Reform Symposiums

Since 2009, Free & Equal has hosted electoral reform symposiums to unite intellectuals and experts to share and debate reforms to the U.S. electoral system. Past panelists and speakers include President of The League of Women Voters of Colorado Nancy Crow, Deputy Secretary of State of Colorado Suzanne Staiert, Founder of FairVote Rob Richie, Founder of Nexus Earth Colin Cantrell, Founder of Ballot Access News Richard Winger and more.

United We Stand Tour

In 2014, Free & Equal launched United We Stand, a festival and tour uniting the younger generations with musicians, artists, and thought leaders to promote political and cultural change. Since its inception, the tour has made stops at Belasco Theater in Los Angeles in 2014 and 2015, University of Colorado Boulder in 2016, and Texas A&M University in 2018. The 2019 tour includes Indiana, Texas, Colorado, Oregon, and Tennessee.

References

External links
Free & Equal Elections Foundation, official website

Charities based in California
Electoral reform groups in the United States
Political and economic research foundations in the United States
United States presidential debates